The International Journal of Mobile and Blended Learning is a quarterly peer-reviewed academic journal which focuses on educational technology, specifically on theoretical, technical, and pedagogical aspects of learning in mobile and blended environments. It is the official journal of the International Association for Mobile Learning and is published on their behalf by IGI Global. The journal was established in 2009 by David Parsons (Massey University), who remains the editor-in-chief. Annual collections of papers from the journal are published as a series of edited books.

Abstracting and indexing
The journal is abstracted and indexed in:

ACM Digital Library
Inspec
Compendex
Emerging Sources Citation Index
PsycINFO
Scopus

References

External links
 

Publications established in 2009
English-language journals
Quarterly journals
Educational technology journals
Mobile and Blended Learning, International Journal of